Howard-Royal House is a historic home located at Salemburg, Sampson County, North Carolina.  It was built in 1892, and is a two-story, three bay by one bay, single pile, frame dwelling with a rear ell.  It has a gable roof and a central two-tier porch flanked by two-story, octagonal bay windows.  Also on the property is a contributing shed.

It was added to the National Register of Historic Places in 1986.

References

Houses on the National Register of Historic Places in North Carolina
Houses completed in 1892
Houses in Sampson County, North Carolina
National Register of Historic Places in Sampson County, North Carolina